Known in the numismatic world as a "Moby Dick Coin", the Ecuadorian 8 Escudos doubloon, minted in Quito, Ecuador, between 1838 and 1843, is the one ounce of gold "sixteen dollar piece" Captain Ahab nails to the mast of the Pequod, promising it to the first man who "raises" Moby-Dick. The coin is first mentioned in Herman Melville's 1851 novel Moby-Dick, in Chapter 36 "The Quarter Deck" and later at length in Chapter 99 "The Doubloon". It is often mistaken as a Spanish doubloon, but this coin was not struck by the Spanish crown or endorsed by the Spanish government. The Moby Dick coin was minted in the Republic of Ecuador, at the Quito mint, many years after its independence from Spain.

In pop culture, the coin plays a central role in Season 1, Episode 4 of Netflix's Carmen Sandiego in 2019.

Gold coins
Currencies of Ecuador
Moby-Dick
Economic history of Ecuador